Wolf Creek Inn State Heritage Site is a state park in the U.S. state of Oregon, administered by the Oregon Parks and Recreation Department.

History
The Wolf Creek Inn was built along the Applegate Trail in 1883 for Henry Smith, a local entrepreneur. It is the oldest continuously operating inn in the Pacific Northwest, and is the site where author Jack London completed his novel Valley of the Moon. The inn also housed actors from the early days of Hollywood when they wanted to escape from the film studios. Celebrities Clark Gable, Carole Lombard, and Orson Welles stayed at the inn.

Today
It was added to the National Register of Historic Places as Wolf Creek Tavern in 1972. The inn was acquired by the Oregon Parks and Recreation Department in 1975. The tavern/restaurant and inn are still in operation.

In the media

On television
In 2014, the Wolf Creek Inn was featured on the TV series Mysteries at the Hotel (broadcast as Hotel Secrets & Legends) as a haunted location. The Wolf Creek Inn was also featured as a lockdown location on a season 15 episode of Ghost Adventures on the Travel Channel, where the crew investigated its many claims of paranormal activity.

See also

 List of Oregon state parks

References

Hotel buildings on the National Register of Historic Places in Oregon
Neoclassical architecture in Oregon
Hotel buildings completed in 1883
State parks of Oregon
Buildings and structures in Josephine County, Oregon
Tourist attractions in Josephine County, Oregon
National Register of Historic Places in Josephine County, Oregon
1975 establishments in Oregon
Reportedly haunted locations in Oregon